is a Japanese diver. She competed in the women's 10 metre platform event at the 2019 World Aquatics Championships. She represented Japan at the 2020 Summer Olympics in Tokyo, Japan. She competed in the women's synchronized 10 metre platform and women's 10 metre platform events.

References

External links
 

2001 births
Living people
Japanese female divers
Place of birth missing (living people)
Divers at the 2020 Summer Olympics
Olympic divers of Japan
Divers at the 2018 Asian Games
21st-century Japanese women